The lalitsa is a wind-blown musical instrument of Greece, widely used in Greek folk music. The flute it is Vessel flute, much like the floghera, though lalitses themselves have no finger holes.

See also
Greek musical instruments
Greek folk music
Greek music

References
Traditional Greek instruments
Musipedia: Λαλίτσα

Greek musical instruments
Greek music